Alexandre Ramagem Rodrigues (born 20 March 1972) is a Brazilian federal police officer and was the Director of the Brazilian Intelligence Agency from 2019 until 2022. In April 2020, after the dismissal of the Director General of the Federal Police of Brazil, Maurício Valeixo, and the resignation of the Minister of Justice and Public Security, Sérgio Moro, Ramagem was chosen by president Jair Bolsonaro as the next Director General. In the past, he was coordinator of the Rio+20, the 2014 FIFA World Cup and the 2016 Summer Olympics. In 2018, Ramagem was security chief of Jair Bolsonaro after he got elected until the date of his inauguration. His nomination was officially signed on 28 April 2020, but his swearing-in was suspended by the Supreme Federal Court a day later. On the same day, Bolsonaro cancelled his nomination.

See also
 Brazilian Intelligence Agency
 Federal Police of Brazil
 Sérgio Moro
 Institutional Security Office of Brazil

References

Living people
Brazilian police officers
1962 births
People from Campinas
Members of the Chamber of Deputies (Brazil) from Rio de Janeiro (state)